Picacho Hills is an planned community and census-designated place (CDP) in Doña Ana County, New Mexico, United States. It was first listed as a CDP prior to the 2020 census.

The CDP takes its name from Picacho Hills Country Club, around which the residential areas of the community have been built.

It is located in Las Cruces Public Schools.

Demographics

References 

Census-designated places in Doña Ana County, New Mexico
Census-designated places in New Mexico